Lee Yong-kyu (Hanja: 李容圭, born August 26, 1985) is an outfielder who plays for the Kiwoom Heroes of the KBO League. He bats and throws left-handed

Amateur career
Lee attended Duksoo High School in Seoul, South Korea. In , he was selected for the South Korea national junior baseball team and competed in the 5th Asian Junior Baseball Championship held in Bangkok, Thailand. Lee led his team to the 14-0 mercy rule victory over China in the round robin phase of the competition, going 3-for-5 with 3 RBIs. South Korea eventually won the Championship for the second time by beating Taiwan in the final.

Notable international careers

Professional career
Lee debuted with the  LG Twins, but after the 2004 season he was traded to the Kia Tigers.

In , Lee batted a career-high .318 (third in the KBO league), and was first in hits (154), second in runs (78) and third in stolen bases (38). He also won his first Golden Glove Award. After the 2006 season, he was selected for the South Korea national baseball team and competed in the Asian Games in Doha, Qatar.

In , Lee was converted from right field to center field. However, he stole only 17 bases, and his batting average dipped to .280, showing a weakness against inside breaking balls from lefties.

In , Lee had another solid season, batting a respectable .312 with 130 hits and 28 stolen bases, but the team did not reach the postseason.

In August 2008, Lee competed for the South Korea national baseball team in the 2008 Summer Olympics, where they won the gold medal in the baseball tournament. He finished the tournament ranked second in batting average (.481).  He was at the plate for 3 of South Korea's 7 runs in their first win against Cuba, delivering a RBI single and hitting into a 2-base error by Norberto González. Lee was 4-for-4 in a 10-1 victory over the Netherlands. In the gold medal game, he hit a double off Pedro Luis Lazo to bring in Park Jin-Man for South Korea's final run in a 3-2 win over Cuba.

In March , Lee was called up to the South Korea national baseball team again for the 2009 World Baseball Classic. He went 4-for-18 with one RBI and four runs, sharing the starting center field position with Lee Jong-Wook. After the WBC, Lee was out with an ankle injury for the first three months of the 2009 KBO season, running into the outfield wall during the Tigers' 2009 home opener against the SK Wyverns on April 7. Lee returned from injury in early July, but his batting performance dipped, ending the season with a batting average of .266 and 45 hits. Before the start of the 2019 season, the team was suspended indefinitely for the trade scandal.

Lee's nickname is "the National Tablesetter". Lee can balance on his left leg for several minutes if need be while awaiting a pitch, and quite often does

Awards and honors
2006 Golden Glove Award (Outfielder)
2011 Golden Glove Award (Outfielder)
2012 Golden Glove Award (Outfielder)

Achievements
2006 Hits Title

Notable international careers

Career statistics

Bold = led KBO

References 

 Profile and stats on the KBO official site

2009 World Baseball Classic players
Baseball players at the 2008 Summer Olympics
Olympic gold medalists for South Korea
Olympic baseball players of South Korea
LG Twins players
Kia Tigers players
Hanwha Eagles players
KBO League center fielders
South Korean baseball players
Baseball players from Seoul
1985 births
Living people
Olympic medalists in baseball
2013 World Baseball Classic players
2017 World Baseball Classic players
Medalists at the 2008 Summer Olympics
Asian Games medalists in baseball
Baseball players at the 2006 Asian Games
Baseball players at the 2010 Asian Games
2015 WBSC Premier12 players
Asian Games gold medalists for South Korea
Asian Games bronze medalists for South Korea
Medalists at the 2006 Asian Games
Medalists at the 2010 Asian Games